The Westin Bayshore  is a hotel overlooking Coal Harbour in Vancouver, British Columbia.

Description
The hotel has 499 rooms, and is located in two buildings, one of which was formerly a low-rise building built in 1961 and one is a newer tower built in 1970.

History
The main wing of the hotel opened as The Bayshore Inn on March 27, 1961. It was the first hotel constructed from scratch by Western International Hotels, which had previously built its business on assuming management of already operating hotels up and down the West Coast. The tower wing was added in 1970.

On March 14, 1972, the world's most famous fugitive billionaire, Howard Hughes, moved into the hotel.  The eccentric business magnate lived in the hotel's three-room, top-floor penthouse for 6 months, and was never seen outside of his room, despite the media's best attempts to photograph him.

The Bayshore Inn was renamed The Westin Bayshore when the hotel chain was renamed Westin Hotels in 1981.

The hotel complex was sold for redevelopment in November 2015 for $290 million, which represented the largest single-asset sale in Canada in 2015 and a record for a Vancouver hotel on both a per-key and gross-value basis.

See also

References

External links

Hotel buildings completed in 1961
Hotels in Vancouver
Westin hotels
1961 establishments in British Columbia